Matomo is a rural commune in the Cercle of Macina in the Ségou Region of southern-central Mali. The administrative center (chef-lieu) is the village of Matoma Marka.

References

External links
.

Communes of Ségou Region